The Kent Kings were an Ohio–Pennsylvania League minor league baseball team that played in 1905. The club is the only known professional team to have been based in Kent, Ohio. Henry Metz managed the team.

References

Defunct minor league baseball teams
Baseball teams established in 1905
1905 establishments in Ohio
Defunct baseball teams in Ohio
Baseball teams disestablished in 1905
Ohio-Pennsylvania League teams